Lara-López is a Spanish compound surname that may refer to:
Adriana Lara López, Mexican computer scientist
Luisa María Lara López (born 1966), Spanish astrophysicist
Maritza Lara-López, Mexican astronomer

Spanish-language surnames